Taunggyi Township is a township of Taunggyi District in the Shan State of Myanmar. The principal town is Taunggyi.

Borders
Taunggyi Township is bordered by the following townships:
 Lawksawk to the north
 Hopong to the north and east
 Hsi Hseng to the east and south
 Nyaungshwe (Yawunghwe) to the west
 Kalaw to the west

Formerly, the northern half of Hopong Township was part of Mong Kung Township (Mongkaung Township).

Demographics

2014

The 2014 Myanmar Census reported that Taunggyi Township had a population of 381,639. The population density was 350.1 people per km². The census reported that the median age was 26.2 years, and 95 males per 100 females. There were 82,604 households; the mean household size was 4.3.

Towns
Taunggyi 
Ayethaya 
Kyauktalonegyi 
Kunlon

Communities
In addition to the town of Taunggyi itself, there are two large towns in Taunggyi Township: Ayetharyar and Kyauktalonegyi. Among the many villages and wards (village census tracts) in Taunggyi Township are:

Notes

External links
 "Taunggyi Google Satellite Map" Maplandia World Gazetteer
 "Taunggyi Township Shan State" Map, 14 June 2010, Myanmar Information Management Unit (MIMU)

 
Townships of Shan State